The following is about the qualification rules and the quota allocation for the biathlon at the 2018 Winter Olympics.

Quota allocation
A total quota of 230 athletes are allowed at the Games (115 both men and women). The first 218 quota allocations will be assigned using a combination of the Nation Cup scores of their top 3 athletes in the individual, sprint, and relay competitions, during the 2016–17 Biathlon World Cup season.  The final 12 spots will be allocated during the 2017–18 Biathlon World Cup season to nations who have not qualified any athletes yet, with a maximum of two per nation.

An athlete also must meet requirements before competing:
During the 2016/17 or 2017/18 Biathlon World Cup season the athlete must have two results at IBU Cup, Open European Championships, World Championships or World Cup in the Sprint or Individual that at a maximum is 20% behind the average time of the top three athletes. Or, two placings in the top half at the Junior World Championships. They also can have a combination of both criteria (one of each). All relay members must meet this requirement as well.

Nations ranked 1-5 in the 2016–17 season will qualify six athletes, 6-20 five athletes, and 21-22 two athletes, for both male and female competitions.  The final six spots in each gender are filled individually in the 2017–18 season from the IBU Qualifying points list to a maximum of two for a nation, from nations not already qualified.  One of these spots will be used by the host if not already qualified.  Additionally, the host will be allowed to enter enough additional athletes to compete in each of the relay races.  There will be no reallocation of unused spots.

Qualification summary

Qualification standings

Final standings after 22 events

Final standings after 22 events

Note that there is a limit of four athletes per nation able to enter each specific event regardless of quota.

References

External links
Full breakdown of Nations Cup standings including how the points are tabulated and which athletes have contributed to their nation's total

Qualification for the 2018 Winter Olympics
Qualification